
Gmina Nadarzyn is a rural gmina (administrative district) in Pruszków County, Masovian Voivodeship, in east-central Poland.

Villages
Gmina Nadarzyn contains the villages and settlements of Bieliny, Kajetany, Kostowiec, Krakowiany, Młochów, Nadarzyn, Parole, Rozalin, Rusiec, Stara Wieś, Strzeniówka, Szamoty, Urzut, Walendów, Wola Krakowiańska, Wolica and Żabieniec.

Neighbouring gminas
Gmina Nadarzyn is bordered by the gminas of Brwinów, Grodzisk Mazowiecki, Lesznowola, Michałowice, Raszyn, Tarczyn and Żabia Wola.

References
Polish official population figures 2006

Nadarzyn
Pruszków County